The Microsoft Security Development Lifecycle is a software development process used and proposed by Microsoft to reduce software maintenance costs and increase reliability of software concerning software security related bugs. It is based on the classical spiral model.

Versions

See also 
 Trusted computing base

Further reading

External links 
 

Software development process
Microsoft initiatives

Data security
Security
Crime prevention
National security
Cryptography
Information governance